David Dillon Gallagher (born January 2, 1952) is a former All-American defensive tackle who played for the University of Michigan Wolverines from 1971–1973 and in the National Football League from 1974-1979.

College career
The University of Michigan's Bentley Historical Library describes Gallagher's contributions as: "One of the finest defensive tackles ever to play at Michigan."  In 1971, he was named to the sophomore All-American team.  As a senior in 1973, he was a co-captain of the Michigan football team.  He made 83 tackles in 1973 and 175 in his three years playing for Bo Schembechler's Wolverines.  He was a consensus first-team All-American as a senior, was also selected twice to the All-Big Ten Academic squad, and was also a recipient of a National Football Foundation and College Football Hall of Fame postgraduate scholarship.

Professional career
Gallagher was drafted in the first round of the 1974 NFL Draft. He had planned to attend medical school, but decided to forgo that to play professional football.

He played five years in the NFL for the Chicago Bears (1974), the New York Giants (1975–1976). He retired from professional football in 1976 and entered medical school. However, in 1978, he returned to professional football. He played for the Detroit Lions in 1978 and 1979.

Honors
In 2005, Gallagher was selected as one of the 100 greatest Michigan football players of all time by the "Motown Sports Revival," ranking 65th on the all-time team.

Notes

See also
Michigan Wolverines Football All-Americans

External links
Bentley Library Profile of Dave Gallagher
Pro-Football-Reference.com
Databasefootball.com

1952 births
Living people
People from Piqua, Ohio
All-American college football players
American football defensive ends
American football defensive tackles
Michigan Wolverines football players
Chicago Bears players
New York Giants players
Detroit Lions players